Pendekanti Venkatasubbaiah (1921-1993) was an Indian politician. He was  the Governor of Bihar from 15 March 1985 to 25 February 1988 and  the Governor of Karnataka, India from 26 February 1988 to 5 February 1990. He was elected to the Lok Sabha and was the Union Minister of State for Home and Parliamentary Affairs in both Indira Gandhi and Rajiv Gandhi cabinet.

Early life 
He was born on 18 June 1921 into an affluent family of agriculturists at Sanjamala, a village in the erstwhile Princely State of Banaganapalli in Madras Presidency, British India.

Other work 
He founded the Vasavi Academy of Education, an organization which runs several educational institutions including the Vasavi College of Engineering, Pendekanti Law College, and Vasavi High School.

See also
 List of Governors of Karnataka
 List of Governors of Bihar

References

External links
 Official biographical sketch in Parliament of India website

Governors of Karnataka
Governors of Bihar
1921 births
1993 deaths
India MPs 1957–1962
India MPs 1962–1967
India MPs 1967–1970
India MPs 1971–1977
India MPs 1977–1979
India MPs 1980–1984
Lok Sabha members from Andhra Pradesh
People from Rayalaseema
People from Kurnool district
Telugu politicians
Indian National Congress politicians from Karnataka
Indian National Congress politicians from Andhra Pradesh
Indian National Congress politicians from Bihar